Nandhaur Wildlife Sanctuary is a wildlife sanctuary in Uttarakhand, India that was created in 2012. It is located in the Terai Arc Landscape, a forest zone that stretches from Uttarakhand in India and extends into Nepal.

Location 
Nandhaur Wildlife Sanctuary lies between the Gola and Sharda Rivers in the Haldwani forest division and links the forests of Ramnagar and Terai central forest division with Shuklaphanta National Park in Nepal. Since 2002, Nandhaur Wildlife Sanctuary has been a part of the Shivalik Elephant Reserve. The Wildlife Institute of India in 2004 recognised Nandhaur Wildlife Sanctuary as one of three viable habitats key to the long-term future of the tiger.

Wildlife

Flora 
Nandhaur Wildlife Sanctuary is primarily a sal forest with more than 100 species of trees including shisham, bamboo, teak and chir pine. Over 30 species of shrubs and about 35 species of climbers and grasses were recorded.

Fauna 
Nandhaur Wildlife Sanctuary hosts about 25 species of mammals, 250 species of birds, 15 species of reptiles and 20 species of fishes. The major mammalian species include Asian elephant, leopard, tiger and sloth bear.

Threats 
Nandhaur Wildlife Sanctuary is threatened by illegal logging and boulder mining, poaching and the diversion of forest land for non-forestry related developmental activities.

References 

Wildlife sanctuaries in Uttarakhand
2012 establishments in Uttarakhand
Protected areas established in 2012